Heather Margaret Ferguson FRSE, Professor of Medical Entomology and Disease Ecology, at Glasgow University; a specialist in researching mosquito vectors that spread malaria, in global regions where this is endemic, aiming to manage and control a disease which the World Health Organization estimates killed over 400,000 people in 2020. Ferguson co-chairs the WHO Vector Control Advisory Group and was elected as a Fellow of the Royal Society of Edinburgh in 2021.

Education and career 
Ferguson graduated BSc (Hons) in Zoology from the University of Toronto in 1995, and MSc from British Columbia University 1998, before completing her doctorate on malaria-parasite vector interactions during 1999 to 2013 in Cell, Animal and Population Biology at the University of Edinburgh. From 2004-2006 she did post-doctoral research seconded from the Laboratory of Entomology, Wageningen University, Netherlands to Tanzania at the Ifakara Health Institute, Morogoro, where she still continues her work (2021) as a visiting scientist.

From 2006-12, Ferguson was funded by BBSRC David Phillips Fellowship in the Glasgow University department of Biodiversity, Animal Health & Comparative Medicine, as a lecturer, and from 2013, as senior lecturer, and reader.

Research 
Ferguson's research output is collated by the University of Glasgow.

And from her early work on genetic and environmental factors on virulence of the parasite in mosquitoes (2002) to disease modelling studies (2020), she has collaborated with researchers in international teams on practical and theoretical research. In 2021, Ferguson and colleagues' studies are progressing in Africa  and SouthEast Asia, and mindful of the socio-economic impact of malaria on the countries where it is prevalent. She has published a WHO technical report on methods of control. And has been developing what is now a patented trap (patent shared between Glasgow and Ifakara institutes).

Her current work is funded by Wellcome Trust, Bill and Melinda Gates Foundation and the U.K. Medical Research Council.

Ferguson has served for over ten years on the editorial board of the academic journal Parasites and Vectors. As well as assessing research for a number of international grant-awarding bodies including WHO, she co-chairs the WHO Vector Control Advisory Group.

Selected publications 

 Gerry F Killeen, Tom A Smith, Heather M Ferguson, Hassan Mshinda, Salim Abdulla, Christian Lengeler, Steven P Kachur. 2007. Preventing childhood malaria in Africa by protecting adults from mosquitoes with insecticide-treated nets. PLoS Med 4(7): e229. doi: 10.1371/journal.pmed.0040229
 Heather M Ferguson, Anna Dornhaus, Arlyne Beeche, Christian Borgemeister, Michael Gottlieb, Mir S Mulla, John E Gimnig, Durland Fish, Gerry F Killeen. 2010. Ecology: A Prerequisite for Malaria Elimination and Eradication. PLoS Med 7(8): e1000303. doi: 10.1371/journal.pmed.1000303
Heather M Ferguson, Andrew F Read. 2002. Why is the effect of malaria parasites on mosquito survival still unresolved? Trends Para 18(6): 256-261. doi: 10.1016/S1471-4922(02)02281-X
Issa N Lyimo, Heather M Ferguson. Ecological and evolutionary determinants of host species choice in mosquito vectors. Trends Para 25(4): 189-196. doi: 10.1016/j.pt.2009.01.005

Awards 
Ferguson was a member of the Young Academy of Scotland (2013), and in 2016 won the Zoological Society of London Scientific Medal (2016) and was recognised by an award for International Knowledge Exchange by the University of Glasgow.  In 2021, she was made a Fellow of the Royal Society of Edinburgh.

References 

Year of birth missing (living people)
Living people
Malariologists
Women biologists
Academics of the University of Glasgow
Alumni of the University of Edinburgh
University of Toronto alumni
University of British Columbia alumni
Fellows of the Royal College of Surgeons of Edinburgh
Fellows of the Royal Society of Edinburgh
Women entomologists